Željko Milanović (born 19 May 1957) in Rijeka) is a former Croatian handball player and coach. He is currently the secretary of Handball Association of Primorje-Gorski Kotar.

Honours
Zamet
Yugoslav Second League (1): 1977–78
Yugoslav Third League (1): 1976–77

References

Croatian male handball players
RK Zamet players
RK Zamet coaches
Yugoslav male handball players
Handball players from Rijeka
1957 births
Living people